Pavlos Iosif Gyparis (1882 – 22 July 1966) was a Hellenic Army officer best known as the commander of the personal guard of Prime Minister Eleftherios Venizelos. He took part in many conflicts, and in 1920 was implicated in the assassination of Ion Dragoumis, a political opponent of Venizelos.

Biography

Born in the Cretan village of Asi Gonia in 1882, as a young man Gyparis took part in paramilitary activities against Turkish, Bulgarian and Romanian interests during the Macedonian Struggle, with great success. Later, during the Balkan Wars, he organized the liberation of the island of Samos from the Ottomans. In 1915, he organized a volunteer corps of Cretans that fought for France in Alsace. After Greece's entry into World War I he fought in the Macedonian front in 1917-18.

In 1920, during a time when the political situation in Greece was extremely polarized between supporters of Prime Minister Eleftherios Venizelos on the one hand, and supporters of the Royal Family on the other, Gyparis was accused of organizing a paramilitary force, the so-called "Democratic Security Battalions", that murdered Ion Dragoumis, one of Venizelos' fiercest political rivals.  However, this was never proven in court.

During the Axis occupation of Greece he fled to the Middle East and joined the forces of the Greek government-in-exile. During the Greek Civil War, Gyparis was active in his home island of Crete, fighting against the communists. He was also elected an MP with the party of Sofoklis Venizelos, the son of Eleftherios.

He died in 1966.

Georgios Papandreou praised him as a fighter for democracy on the side of Venizelos.

References

1882 births
1966 deaths
People from Chania (regional unit)
Greek people of the Macedonian Struggle
Greek military personnel of the Balkan Wars
Greek military personnel of World War I
Greek anti-communists
Hellenic Army officers
Members of the Hellenic Parliament
Eleftherios Venizelos
Greek military personnel of World War II
Date of birth missing
Place of death missing
Military personnel from Crete